Lake Allicocha (possibly from Quechua alli good, sane, qucha lake, "good lake" or "sane lake") is a lake in the Cordillera Blanca in the Andes of  Peru located in the Ancash Region, Asunción Province, Chacas District; at a height of , 204 m long and 113 m at its widest point. Lake Allicocha lies southwest of Copa.

The shore of the lake is covered with quenual trees (Polylepis sp.) and shrubs and herbs like: ichu (Jarava ichu), shunqu shunqu (Stangea erikae), botoncillo (Werneria dactylophylla), lleqllish qora (Werneria nubigena), warqu (Austrocylindropuntia flocossa), rima rima (Krapfia weberbaueri) and taulli macho (Lupinus weberbaueri).

References 

Lakes of Peru
Lakes of Ancash Region